Alalay is a location in the Cochabamba Department in central Bolivia. It is the seat of the Alalay Municipality, the third municipal section of the Mizque Province.

References 

 Instituto Nacional de Estadistica de Bolivia

Populated places in Cochabamba Department